Mark Humphrey may refer to:

 Mark Humphrey (actor) (born 1960), Canadian actor
 Mark Humphrey (designer), English designer
 Mark Humphrey (racing driver), British racing driver